William G. Garvey was an English professional footballer who played as a left half in the Football League for Fulham.

Personal life 

Garvey served in the British Armed Forces during the First World War.

Career statistics

References 

English footballers
Fulham F.C. players
English Football League players
British military personnel of World War I
1888 births
Year of death missing
Association football wing halves
Footballers from Greater London
Metrogas F.C. players